Puteri Wangsa is a state constituency in Johor, Malaysia, that is represented in the Johor State Legislative Assembly.

Demographics

History

Polling districts 
According to the gazette issued on 30 March 2018, the Puteri Wangsa constituency has a total of 20 polling districts.

Representation history

Election Results

References 

Johor state constituencies